Bartholdi is a surname. Notable people with the surname include:

 Frédéric Auguste Bartholdi (1834–1904), French sculptor best known for the Statue of Liberty
 Joe Bartholdi Jr. (born 1980), American poker player

See also
 Bartholdy